Acritotilpha is a genus of moths belonging to the family Tineidae. It contains only one species, Acritotilpha siliginella, which is found in Morocco.

References

Tineidae
Monotypic moth genera
Moths of Africa
Tineidae genera